The 1st Chapter is the debut album by the Norwegian progressive metal band, Circus Maximus. The 1st Chapter was released on May 14, 2005 in Norway and on June 7, 2005 in the United States. The ongoing theme of The 1st Chapter is about "the journey" to salvation expressed through the lyrics. Musically, it sports a circus-like theme (that actually can be heard) playing throughout the album.

The lyrics to the song "Glory of the Empire" refer heavily to the 2000 film, Gladiator.

The 1st Chapter contains the longest running Circus Maximus song with "The 1st Chapter" running for 19 minutes and 7 seconds.

Track listing

Bonus Tracks

Personnel
 Michael Eriksen – vocals
 Mats Haugen – guitars
 Truls Haugen – drums, backing vocals
 Glen Cato Møllen – bass guitar
 Espen Storø – keyboards

Production 
 Produced by Circus Maximus
 Mixed and mastered by Tommy Hansen (Jailhouse Studios)
 Artwork by Mattias Norèn (Progart Media)
 Layout and logo by Claus Jensen (Intromental Design)

References

External links 
 Official Circus Maximus website

Circus Maximus (Norwegian band) albums
2005 debut albums
Frontiers Records albums